Oxley Vale is a suburb of Tamworth, New South Wales, Australia, which runs either side of Manilla road. It is between the suburbs of North Tamworth and the satellite suburb of Hallsville. 
Oxley Vale is a largely residential suburb. Nazareth House nursing house is located there.

Mobile Phone Blackspot Program
Vodafone will serve the town and surrounding area with mobile phone service as part of the National Blackspot Program from Q4 2016.

Sports
 Oxley Vale Attunga Football Club is the major sporting club of this suburb. Oxley Vale Attunga although playing in North Tamworth it draws the majority of its players and thousands of supporters from this suburb.

Schools

Oxley Vale Public School
St. Marys Catholic School

References

Suburbs of Tamworth, New South Wales